Živojin Juškić (born 16 December 1969) is a Serbian former professional footballer who played as a defensive midfielder and current manager.

Playing career
In the summer of 1996, Juškić was one of the players transferred from Dinamo Pančevo to Obilić. He eventually captained the team that surprisingly won the 1997–98 First League of FR Yugoslavia. In January 1999, Juškić moved abroad to Bundesliga side 1. FC Nürnberg, appearing in three games until the end of the season. He subsequently spent one year at Greuther Fürth, making 10 appearances in the Zweite Bundesliga. In the summer of 2000, Juškić switched to Regionalliga Süd side Darmstadt 98. He spent the rest of his career with the club, amassing over 150 appearances in seven years.

Post-playing career
In April 2003, while recovering from injury, Juškić was set to replace Hans-Werner Moser at the helm of Darmstadt 98 as interim player-manager. He again served as manager of Darmstadt 98 from 2009 to 2010.

Juškić was manager of TS Ober-Roden from 2011 to 2016. He subsequently served as the club's sporting director, before retaking the managerial role in late 2017.

Honours
Obilić
 First League of FR Yugoslavia: 1997–98
 FR Yugoslavia Cup: Runner-up 1997–98

References

External links
 
 

1. FC Nürnberg players
2. Bundesliga players
Association football midfielders
Bundesliga players
Expatriate football managers in Germany
Expatriate footballers in Germany
First League of Serbia and Montenegro players
FK Dinamo Pančevo players
FK Obilić players
FK Radnički Beograd players
FK Zvezdara players
People from Zaječar
Serbia and Montenegro expatriate footballers
Serbia and Montenegro expatriate sportspeople in Germany
Serbia and Montenegro footballers
Serbian expatriate footballers
Serbian expatriate sportspeople in Germany
Serbian football managers
Serbian footballers
SpVgg Greuther Fürth players
SV Darmstadt 98 managers
SV Darmstadt 98 players
1969 births
Living people